Adriaan Luteijn (born 1964) is a Dutch choreographer who has worked with many dancers and ensembles in the Netherlands and in other countries.

Career

Adriaan Luteijn was born 's Heer Arendskerke, a village in the southwest of the Netherlands, in 1964. He trained as a dancer at Fontys Dance Academy in Tilburg.
In 1989 he joined Introdans Ensemble for Youth when it was created, taking a leading position due to his unusual visual appearance and his expressive dance techniques.
He retired from dancing in 1998 at the age of 35 and began working as choreographer and teacher. He has worked with children, people with disabilities and the elderly.
He has traveled widely.
He has worked with many dancers and ensembles in the Netherlands and other countries.
He has been the choreographer for major projects such as the close of the 2006 international Dance and the Child (DACI) conference, the Grandeur procession for Sonsbeek 2008 and the Arnhem Fairy Tale Festival.

Adriaan Luteijn is now artistic manager and choreographer at Introdans, which runs a program called "Introdans Interactive".
This involves interactive workshops that teach young people to participate creatively in dance, classes and performances of integrated and disability dance, and youth performances.
In 2008 he was guest speaker at the Ukukhua Komdanso Youth Dance Festival in Durban, South Africa, and this led to a relationship with the Flatfoot Dance Company in which  Introdans and Flatfoot visited each other, shared classes and workshops and put on a joint performance in Arnhem in 2010. One important element of Luteijn’s work with other target groups is formed by ‘De Ontmoeting’ (The Encounter). For this dance production he has worked with dancers from Brazil, South Africa and Indonesia, with young people who have a muscle disease and with people who have autism. In many projects of this type, says Luteijn, it’s as if I’m continually having gifts of moving moments thrown into my lap.

Works

Luteijn draws inspiration from the Romantic era ballets, with their mathematical approach to the choreography of groups and their theatrical expression.
Some of his works are Giselle, created for Studio Contemporary Dance Zagreb, POP!? for Coppelia, Cinderella for ArtEZ Dance Academy in Arnhem, and Check in/Check out and Peter en de Wolf for the Fontys Dance Academy.
He was choreographer for the film De wonderbaarlijke mandarijn.
His Happy, Happy Birthday Baby celebrates the 75th birthday of Hans van Manen.

 * Sneeuw (1997)
 * Hum Aapke Hain Koun..! (1998)
 * Mini-Mozart (2001)
 * Bayadère (2002)
 * De Ontmoeting: Cyberangel (2002)
 * De Ontmoeting: Mag ik deze dans (2003)
 * De Ontmoeting: Jong geleerd Oud gedanst (2004)
 * Gala (2004)
 * De Ontmoeting: CC (2005)
 * De Ontmoeting: Het Duel (2005)
 * Geen Zwanen Meer (2005)
 * Happy, Happy Birthday Baby (2007)
 * Les Entr'actes (2008)
 * Iungo (2009)
 * De Ontmoeting: Kamerbewoners (2010)
 * celebrAGE (2011)
 * De Ontmoeting: FAUXdeville (2012)
 * Giselle (2013)
 * De Ontmoeting: Invisibly Visible (2014)
 * Het Slecht Bewaakte Meisje (2015)
 * Bal Spécial (2015)
 * De Ontmoeting: Cardiac Output (2016)
 * De Ontmoeting: Op Bach (2018)
 * De Ontmoeting: Roze Cast (2018)
 * Lenteritueel (2018) i.s.m. Timothy de Gilde
 * De Ontmoeting: Circular (2018)
 * VIER VERHALEN EN EEN DAG (2019) in collaboration with Marlena Wolfe, Spinvis and Saartje Van Camp
 * EVACUÉ (2019) in collaboration with Charli Chung
 * De Ontmoeting: Doublé (2019)
 * Pink Panther Party   
 * Iungo: Nest   
 * Pro Forma 1   
 * Circular   
 * Circular   
 * Scalabor   
 * HubClub’23

Reception

Adriaan Luteijn won the Incentive Prize in 2003 from Dancers' Fund '79. 
He won the "Kunstfactor Dans Oeuvre" prize in 2008 for his original style and broad appeal.In 2018 Luteijn was honoured for his special work and appointed Knight of the Order of Orange-Nassau.

References

1964 births
Living people
Dutch choreographers
People from Goes